The Morris Commercial J4 was a 10 cwt (0.5 ton) forward-control van (driver's controls in front of front wheels) launched by Morris Commercial in 1960 and produced with two facelifts until 1974.

The van was marketed first as both the Morris J4 and the Austin J4.  Following the formation of the British Leyland Motor Corporation in 1968, into which British Motor Corporation (BMC), by then a subsidiary of British Motor Holdings, had been absorbed, the van was branded as the BMC J4.

Description

Engine and running gear
The van was fitted available with the familiar B series petrol engine in 1622cc form and also, at extra cost, with a 1500 cc diesel unit.  Stopping power came from drum brakes all round; there was no servo assistance.   Suspension was similar to that on the Austin Cambridge/Morris Oxford of the time:  the front independent suspension incorporated coil springs and hydraulic "Lever-type" shock absorbers while the rear springing was achieved by semi-elliptic leaf springs.

Naming and capacity
In the 1960s light vans were often named simply by their load capacity, and the van at the time was often called simply the Morris 10/12 cwt.

Developments
During its life the van underwent minor improvements under the metal. However, even in 1967 the vans were still shipped with synchromesh on the top three forward gears only. The engine lived in the driver's cabin between the two seats: the van was considered unusually noisy, even in the 1960s. A J4-based petrol-engined motor caravan was tested by Britain's Autocar magazine in 1967. It managed a maximum speed of 63 mph (101 km/h) and a time from 0–50 mph (80 km/h) of 20.2 seconds.

This van became a familiar sight on British streets collecting and delivering mail in the Royal Mail livery of the Post Office. Although quite a successful light commercial, it sold mainly by virtue of keen pricing to large fleets, living after 1965 in the shadow of the all conquering front engined Ford Transit, as did several other British built 60s/70s light commercials such as the Standard Atlas, Commer FC and the formerly class-leading but now ageing Bedford CA. Whilst competent as a van, the Morris J4 offered a rather poor driving experience even by the standards of the day.

The sliding front doors were replaced by a pair of conventional front-hinged doors for the last model year (1973-74).

Replacement
The J4 was replaced in 1974 by the front-engined Sherpa van, which utilised the rear panel work of the J4 virtually unchanged. The Sherpa remained in production in various forms until 2006. During this time, in various wheel-bases and track widths, it became The Freight Rover, LDV 200, LDV Pilot. The LDV Maxus was a completely new development produced jointly with Daewoo. 

During much of this time it also became available as a chassis-cab, pickup, tipper, Luton, Mini-bus and Camper (Motor Caravan.)

Spain
A diesel-powered version of the van was produced in Valladolid, Spain by SAVA ("Sociedad Anónima de Vehículos Automóviles"), between 1965 and 1989 and sold successively under several names including SAVA J4 and Pegaso J4.

Popular culture

A London Metropolitan Police J4 (usually referred to as a Black Maria) appears parked in the street on the cover of the Beatles Abbey Road. The van had been driven down by the policeman who came to stop the traffic behind the camera during the photo shoot. There was a second police officer out of sight further ahead up the road stopping any oncoming traffic.
The Beatles also were transported in an Austin J4 minibus owned by their then manager Allan Williams when playing clubs in Hamburg Germany around 1960-1962 era.

In the film Withnail and I a London Metropolitan Police J4 van overtakes Withnail and Marwood in their Jaguar Mark 2. One of the police officers slides back the door of the van, motioning Withnail to pull over, before ordering him to "get in the back of the van!"

See also
 Commer FC – similarly-sized vans from the same period
 Ford Thames 400E

References

Further reading

J4
Vans
Vehicles introduced in 1960